"Bora! Bora! Bora!" is a single by German hard dance band Scooter. It was released on 26 May 2017 as the first single from their nineteenth studio album Scooter Forever. The song samples Scooter's own song "The United Vibe" from their 2007 album The Ultimate Aural Orgasm.

Track listing
CD single (2-track) / Download
 "Bora! Bora! Bora!" – 3:13
 "Bora! Bora! Bora! (Extended Mix)" – 4:00

Charts

References

External links
 Scooter Official website

Scooter (band) songs
2017 singles
Songs written by H.P. Baxxter
Songs written by Jens Thele
Songs written by Michael Simon (DJ)
2017 songs